Arkadiusz Czarnecki (born 10 July 1987 in Olsztyn) is a Polish footballer who last played for Flota Świnoujście.

Career

Club
In February 2011, he signed a one-year contract with KSZO Ostrowiec.

References

External links
 
 
 Arkadiusz Czarnecki at FuPa

1987 births
Living people
Polish footballers
Polish expatriate footballers
Poland youth international footballers
I liga players
II liga players
Lech Poznań II players
Lech Poznań players
Flota Świnoujście players
Elana Toruń players
Ruch Wysokie Mazowieckie players
KSZO Ostrowiec Świętokrzyski players
Bytovia Bytów players
Sandecja Nowy Sącz players
OKS Stomil Olsztyn players
MKP Pogoń Siedlce players
Association football defenders
Sportspeople from Olsztyn
Polish expatriate sportspeople in Germany
Expatriate footballers in Germany